GraceKennedy Limited is one of the Caribbean's largest conglomerates, with several diversified companies in the Caribbean, Europe and North America.

Group members 
The group includes:
 Banking and financial services
 First Global Bank Limited
 First Global Financial Services Limited
 FG Funds Management (Cayman) Limited
 First Global Trinidad & Tobago Limited (formerly One1 Financial Limited)
 Signia Financial Group Incorporated
 Remittances
 GraceKennedy Remittance Services Limited
 GraceKennedy Remittance Services (United States) Incorporated
 GraceKennedy Remittance Services (Trinidad & Tobago) Limited
 GraceKennedy Remittance Services (Guyana) Limited
 Insurance (life and general)
 Allied Insurance Brokers Limited
 GK General (Eastern Caribbean) Insurance Company Limited
 First Global Insurance Brokers Limited
 GK General Insurance Company Limited
 Trident Insurance Company Limited
 Manufacturing, retail and distribution
 Dairy Industries (Jamaica) Limited
 Grace Foods and Services Company
 GraceKennedy (Belize) Limited
 Grace Food Processors Limited
 Grace Food Processors (Canning) Limited
 GraceKennedy (United States) Incorporated
 Grace Foods International Limited
 National Processors Division
 World Brands Services Limited
 Hi-Lo Food Stores (Jamaica) Limited
 GK Foods (United Kingdom) Limited
 GraceKennedy (Ontario) Incorporated
 Hardware & Lumber Limited
 Strategic investments
 Peak Bottling Water 
 Majesty Foods Meat Patties

History 
One of the company's founders (Dr. John J. Grace) had worked for Grace Ltd, a wholly owned subsidiary of New York's W. R. Grace and Company. When, in 1922, W.R.Grace decided to divest the Jamaican subsidiary, Dr. Grace bought the company and, along with Fred Kennedy, a Jamaican, co-founded Grace, Kennedy and Company Limited. The company, which first operated as a small trading establishment, soon acquired wharfing facilities in order to facilitate its imports.

It has expanded and diversified over the years, changing from a privately owned enterprise to a  public company listed on the stock exchanges of Jamaica, Trinidad, Barbados and the Eastern Caribbean.

Today, the GraceKennedy Group comprises a varied network of some 60 subsidiaries and associated companies located across the Caribbean and in North and Central America and the United Kingdom.  Their operations span the food distribution, financial, insurance, remittance, hardware retailing and food-processing industries.

In 1995, GraceKennedy developed its 2020 Vision, the objective being to transform from a Jamaican trading company to a global consumer group by the year 2020.  At the end of 2006 its market value stood at J$21 billion, up from $1.29 billion in 1995 - an increase of 1500%.

In March 2020, GraceKennedy acquired 65 percent of Key Insurance Company.

External links 
  - Grace Kennedy Group
  - Grace Foods
 The GraceKennedy Foundation at a Glance
 Grace Caribbean Traditions web site.

References 

Companies based in Kingston, Jamaica
Jamaican brands